Allen Cohen (1940 – April 29, 2004) was an American poet. Born in 1940 in Brooklyn, New York, he attended Brooklyn College and then moved to San Francisco in 1963. There, he founded and edited the San Francisco Oracle underground newspaper, which was published from 1966 to 1968. After the September 11 attacks, he edited a newspaper entitled Peace News, and in 2002 co-edited a poetry anthology entitled An Eye for an Eye Makes the Whole World Blind: Poets on 9/11.  Cohen died of liver cancer and hepatitis C on April 29, 2004 in Walnut Creek, California.

References

External links
Allen Cohen

American male poets
Jewish American poets
American newspaper editors
Writers from San Francisco
Writers from Brooklyn
Deaths from liver cancer
Deaths from hepatitis
1940 births
2004 deaths
20th-century American poets
20th-century American male writers
20th-century American non-fiction writers
American male non-fiction writers
Brooklyn College alumni
20th-century American Jews
21st-century American Jews